Novadios is a privately held legal services outsourcing company headquartered in Los Angeles, California with its labor operations facility located in Córdoba, Argentina. Novadios provides legal process outsourcing services to in-house counsel and law firms located in the U.S. and the U.K. through the utilization of Argentine legal professionals in conjunction with U.S. legal supervision. Novadios is recognized as a Western Hemisphere nearshore alternative to the Eastern Hemisphere Asian outsourcing labor model.

Services
Novadios operates two primary practice groups:  the Transactional Services Group and the Litigation Support Group.  The Transactional Services Group renders legal services to corporate customers and law firms in the areas of contract review and drafting; document review; corporate governance support; legal form creation and administration; Latin American legal and corporate services; data mining and Six Sigma LEAN consultation services for legal departments. The Transactional Services Group's capabilities are implemented most commonly within a company's procurement, information technology, intellectual property licensing, treasury, and entertainment divisions. The Litigation Support Group renders primary and secondary level document review services in connection with potential litigation and in response to subpoena requests, including relevancy and privileged analysis determinations.

Outsourcing in Argentina
Argentina's Western Hemisphere proximity to the United States, its favorable global labor arbitrage economy, and its educated populace are some of the key factors that create unique advantages to outsourcing in the region. The country's UTC-03 Time Zone is situated one or two hours ahead of the Eastern Time Zone (subject to the season) and operating between North and South America does not require straddling the International Date Line. Argentina was the 14th fastest growing economy in 2010 spurred substantially by a stable exchange rate that favors exports and maintains Argentina's consistent fiscal and trade surpluses. Argentine's are well educated, boasting a 97% literacy rate, and the cultural affinity shared between the United States and Argentina appeals to foreign investment in the region, particularly with regard to outsourcing.

Córdoba, Argentina, with a population of approximately 1.3 million people, is Argentina's second largest city and home to several first class universities that have earned the region the nickname, "La Docta." Because of its highly educated populace, Córdoba is able to take advantage of the Knowledge Process Outsourcing substrata of the outsourcing industry in general, where its skilled and advanced educated labor base is utilized to render higher-level and more complex outsourced services. As a result of these particular skilled labor advantages, Córdoba is host to numerous multinational companies that have made outsourcing investments in the region, such as Motorola, Intel Corporation, HP Enterprise Services, Volkswagen, 3M, Lockheed Martin, Microsoft, and Sykes Enterprises.

Ethical Considerations
Outsourced legal service providers with offshore labor bases utilize foreign lawyers who may not be qualified to practice law in the customer's jurisdictions. The New York City Bar Association, Los Angeles County Bar Association, San Diego County Bar Association and the Florida Bar Association have each issued advisory opinions generally opining as acceptable the practice of utilizing foreign legal professionals who are not qualified to practice law in the United States to render legal services within the United States; provided, however, that the outsourcing enterprise complies with certain ethical duties that include:  the duty to maintain customer confidentiality; the duty to refrain from aiding in the unauthorized practice of law; the duty to disclose the pertinent details of the outsourcing operation; the duty to avoid conflicts of interest; the duty to bill fairly; and the duty to supervise the work being performed by the non-qualified legal labor.  Novadios complies in all respects to these ethical requirements, including requiring its foreign attorneys to adhere to the California Rules of Professional Conduct, and maintaining a staff of domestic U.S.-qualified counsel in project supervisory capacities.

References

Outsourcing companies